Lenore Chinn (born June 20, 1949) is an American artist best known for her American realist paintings and her queer activism. Chinn was a founding member of Lesbians in the Visual Arts and Queer Cultural Center (QCC) and served on the San Francisco Human Rights Commission. She is currently based in San Francisco, California.

Biography 
Lenore Chinn was born in San Francisco, California in the United States, a second generation Chinese-American. Both her mother and father were raised in the Chinatown. Her father was a mathematician. The Chinn's taught their children traditional Cantonese and American cultures and values. When Chinn was two years old, her family moved to the Richmond District of San Francisco. The Chinn family was one of the first Chinese-American's to move to the area dominated by white, middle-class neighbors. Because of their position as a minority in a primarily Caucasian area, the family taught Lenore and her younger brother about Chinese stereotypes. In an interview conducted by Rudy Lemcke in 2001, Chinn said, "I grew up with a family model, which offered simultaneously a traditional Chinese cultural framework of community and family, along with the opportunity to embrace non-traditional and non-Asian ideas. In short, my life's journey became a cross-pollination of other world views." These teachings would influence Chinn's artwork. Today, the Richmond District's largest ethnic group is Chinese.

Chinn attended George Washington High School. She continued her studies a City College of San Francisco. In 1972, while on the Dean's list, she earned her Bachelor of Arts from San Francisco State College in Sociology.

Chinn moved to the Castro District in the 1980s and became involved in activist groups, including the Harvey Milk Club. As the AIDS epidemic impacted her life, she started painting portraits of people in the district. Chinn co-founded the Lesbians in the Visual Arts and Queer Cultural Center (QCC). In 1991 Chinn joined the Asian American Women Artists Association (AAWAA), based in San Francisco. Her work often aims to fight cultural stereotypes by showcasing minorities and homosexuality.

Chinn speaks about her work and about lesbianism. She has spoken at the College Art Association, Women's Caucus for Art, and other organizations. Chinn is also a curator, working at galleries in San Francisco. She has exhibited her paintings at Pacific Union College and the National Arts Club.

References

Further reading 
Latimer, Tirza True, Moira Roth, Valerie Soe and Jennifer Banta. Cultural Confluences: The Art of Lenore Chinn. San Francisco: Asian Pacific Islander Cultural Center (2011). 
Chadwick, Whitney. Women, Art and Society, Fifth Edition. New York: Thames & Hudson Inc. (2012).

External links
Lenore Chinn's official website
Archives of American Art, Smithsonian Institution: Oral History Interview

1949 births
American realist painters
American artists of Chinese descent
Artists from San Francisco
City College of San Francisco alumni
San Francisco State University alumni
Living people
American LGBT rights activists
Activists from California
American lesbian artists